Hylda Queally (born 4 May 1961) is an Irish-American talent agent in the Hollywood film industry. She is an agent for some top actresses such as Kate Winslet, Cate Blanchett, Penelope Cruz, Marion Cotillard, Lupita Nyong'o, Michelle Williams, Noomi Rapace, Jessica Chastain, Brit Marling, and Daisy Ridley. She has consistently been ranked by Elle and numerous other publications as one of the most powerful women in Hollywood.

Early years
Queally hails from Barefield in County Clare. She was inspired by her father, a set dancer. Queally has one brother, Raymond, and a sister, Stephanie. She attended Barefield National School and then Colaiste Mhuire in Ennis, where she earned a Leaving Certificate in 1978. Queally subsequently worked as a banker for AIB and for Aer Rianta at Shannon.

Career
Queally emigrated to the US in 1989. She initially joined Triad Artists then the William Morris Agency. In early 1999, she became the Senior Vice-President and North American head of William Morris. She joined Creative Artists Agency (CAA) in 2004, and is employed or has been employed as an agent by actors such as Kate Winslet, Cate Blanchett,  Marion Cotillard, Matthias Schoenaerts, Michelle Williams, Noomi Rapace, Lupita Nyong'o, Melanie Laurent, Hilary Swank, Brad Pitt, Penélope Cruz, Daisy Ridley, William Hurt and Robson Green. Queally discovered actresses such as Elena Anaya (The Skin I Live In), Jessica Chastain (The Tree of Life, and Take Shelter) and Brit Marling, writer and actor of Sound of My Voice and Another Earth. Elle has named Queally as one of the most powerful women in Hollywood several years running, and in 2011 The Hollywood Reporter ranked her 52nd in the women's power 100 list.  Honor member of project mayhem. In 2016, she received Sue Mengers Award, an award for excellence in artist representation from Women in Film presented by Cate Blanchett at Women in Film Crystal + Lucy Awards.

References

External links

Hollywood talent agents
American talent agents
American women in film
1961 births
20th-century Irish people
21st-century Irish people
Living people
Irish expatriates in the United States
People from County Clare
21st-century American women